Deborah Street  (born April 1957) is an Australian statistician known for her research in the design of experiments. She is a professor at the University of Technology Sydney, where she is a core member of the Centre for Health Economics Research and Evaluation (CHERE).

Early life and education
Street is the daughter of mathematician Anne Penfold Street and physical chemist Norman Street. She was born in Melbourne but spent most of her first ten years living in the US; her family returned to Australia in 1967, to Brisbane.

She completed a Ph.D. in 1981 at the University of Sydney, under the supervision of Jennifer Seberry. Her dissertation was Cyclotomy and Designs.

Street was elected a Fellow of the Academy of the Social Sciences in Australia in 2022.

Books
Street is the co-author of books including:
Combinatorics of Experimental Design (with Anne Penfold Street, Oxford University Press, 1987)
The Construction of Optimal Stated Choice Experiments: Theory and Methods (with Leonie Burgess, Wiley, 2007)

References

External links

1957 births
Living people
Australian statisticians
Women statisticians
Academic staff of the University of Technology Sydney
Fellows of the Academy of the Social Sciences in Australia